The Status of the Union Act, 1934 (Act No. 69 of 1934) was an act of the Parliament of South Africa that was the South African counterpart to the Statute of Westminster 1931. It declared the Union of South Africa to be a "sovereign independent state" and explicitly adopted the Statute of Westminster into South African law. It also removed any remaining power of the British Parliament to legislate for South Africa, and ended the United Kingdom's involvement in the granting or refusal of royal assent.

The Statute of Westminster applied to South Africa without needing ratification from its Parliament (unlike the case in Australia and New Zealand), so the Status Act was not legally necessary to establish South Africa's full sovereignty. It was, however, seen as a symbolic action by the Pact government of Prime Minister J. B. M. Hertzog, coming as it did shortly before the merger of his National Party with Jan Smuts's South African Party to form the United Party.

The Status of the Union Act was repealed by the Republic of South Africa Constitution Act, 1961, which ended South Africa's membership of the Commonwealth of Nations and transformed it into a republic.

Provisions
The Status Act incorporated the Statute of Westminster into South African law as if it were an act of the South African Parliament. Sections 7 to 10 of the Statute were omitted because they dealt with matters specific to other Dominions of the British Commonwealth. The act further declared that "the Parliament of the Union shall be the sovereign legislative power in and over the Union," and that no act of the British Parliament would extend to South Africa unless extended by an act of the South African Parliament. This went further than the Statute of Westminster, which allowed the British Parliament to legislate for the Dominions at their request and with their consent.

With respect to the executive, the Status Act prescribed that the King, when exercising his executive powers in regard to South Africa, was required to act on the advice of the South African Prime Minister and Cabinet only. This made explicit what had previously been a constitutional convention.

The Status Act also altered the law governing the granting of the Royal Assent. Originally, the Governor-General had three options when a bill was sent to him by Parliament: to assent to it, to withhold his assent (i.e. veto it), or to reserve it for the signification of the King's pleasure. Reservation meant sending it to the King for a decision, which would be taken on the advice of the British cabinet. The Status Act removed this power of reservation, requiring the Governor-General to either sign or veto each bill. It also removed the King's power to disallow (i.e. veto) an act within a year after the Governor-General had assented to it.

While it made the executive and legislative branches of the South African government completely independent of Britain, the Status Act did not affect the judicial branch. Appeals to the Privy Council from the Appellate Division remained possible until 1950.

References

External links
 Status of the Union Act, 1934 at Wikisource

Repealed South African legislation
1934 in South African law
South Africa–United Kingdom relations
South Africa and the Commonwealth of Nations